Majewski (feminine: Majewska; plural: Majewscy) is a surname. It is derived from Polish place names such as Majewo and the Polish word for the month of May (maj). It is related to surnames in several other languages.

People

Majewski, Majewska
 Adam Majewski, Polish footballer
 Alicja Majewska (born 1948), Polish singer
 Andrzej Majewski (born 1966), Polish aphorist and writer
 Arnold Majewski (1892–1942), Finnish soldier of Polish descent
 Bartosz Majewski (born 1987), Polish modern pentathlete
 Chester P. Majewski (1928–1983), American lawyer and politician
 Ewa Majewska (born 1978), Polish philosopher and activist
 Francisco Majewski (1939–2012), Uruguayan footballer
 Gary Majewski (born 1980), American baseball player
 Hans-Martin Majewski (1911–1997), German film composer
 Janusz Majewski (born 1931), Polish film director
 Janusz Majewski (born 1940), Polish fencer
 Lech Majewski (born 1953), Polish-American director and writer
 Magdalena Majewska (born 1963), Polish journalist
 Malgosia Majewska (born 1981), 
 Michał Majewski, Polish fencer
 Neil Majewski (born 1954), Australian cricketer
 Pelagia Majewska (1933 - 1988) record setting Polish glider pilot.
 Radosław Majewski (born 1986), Polish footballer
 Stefan Majewski (born 1956), Polish football player and manager
 Szymon Majewski (born 1967), Polish journalist and entertainer
 Tomasz Majewski (born 1981), Polish shot putter
 Val Majewski (born 1981), American baseball player

Mayevsky, Mayevskaya, Maevsky, and other forms
 Anna Mayevskaya, Soviet luger
 Dmitry Maevsky (1917–1992), Russian painter
 Ivan Mayewski (born 1988), Belarusian footballer
 Konstantin Mayevsky (born 1979), Russian futsal player
 Vladimir May-Mayevsky (1867–1920), Russian general

See also
 
 
 
 DPP v Majewski,  English criminal law case
 Majewski's polydactyly syndrome, form of neonatal dwarfism

References

Further reading
 Grosvald, Sara. Antisemitism. An Annotated Bibliography. (DeGruyter, 2007)

Polish-language surnames
Jewish surnames